Joseph P. Genier is an American Producer, Production Manager, member of the directors guild of America, co-founder of Capital Arts Entertainment, and the founder and owner of Push Worldwide. He is best known for producing Tyler Perry's "Madea" movies as well as MTV's Teen Wolf.

Film career
Genier graduated from Cornell University in 1992 with a Bachelor of Science degree in Communications. and began producing films and television shows shortly thereafter.  He is now based in Los Angeles since 2010 when Teen Wolf was relocated to Northridge after previous filming in Georgia.   He is the head of Production at Capital Arts Entertainment and the owner and founder of Push Worldwide, the distribution arm for Capital Arts.

Filmography

References

External links
Capital Arts Entertainment, Inc.
Push Worldwide
 
 

Living people
American television producers
Cornell University alumni
Year of birth missing (living people)